Guifré Vidal  is a Spanish physicist who is working on quantum many-body physics using analytical and numerical techniques. In particular, he is one of the leading experts of tensor network state implementations such as time-evolving block decimation (TEBD) and multiscale entanglement renormalization ansatz (MERA). He was previously a faculty member of Perimeter Institute in Waterloo, Canada. However as of September 2019, he is now a research scientist at Sandbox @ Alphabet.

External links
Science Watch interview
Perimeter announcement

Spanish physicists
Living people
Year of birth missing (living people)